The Central New York Regional Transportation Authority, commonly referred to as Centro, is a New York State public benefit corporation and the operator of mass transit in Onondaga, Oswego, Cayuga, and Oneida counties in New York state. The CNYRTA was formed on August 1, 1970, along with similar agencies in Rochester, Albany, and Buffalo. 

Centro won the American Public Transportation Association's 2006 "Outstanding Public Transportation System Achievement Award" for bus companies serving 4 million to 30 million riders a year.

Organization
Centro has a 9-member board of directors, including one non-voting member. Its CEO is Brian Schultz. In 2017, Centro had operating expenses of $93.34 million, no outstanding debt, and a level of staffing of 738 people.

Subsidiaries

The Central New York Regional Transportation Authority is authorized by the State of New York to operate transit services in Cayuga, Cortland, Jefferson, Madison, Oneida, Onondaga, and Oswego counties. The below subsidiaries operate transit services in the counties that have opted-in to the transportation district.

CNY Centro

The biggest service subsidiary, CNY Centro, operates service in the city of Syracuse and suburban Onondaga County. Centro took over the assets and operations of the Syracuse Transit Corporation on January 17, 1972, and those of the suburban Syracuse & Eastern Transit Corp. in 1974. CNY Centro staff provide support and administrative functions; including marketing, procurement, route planning, human resources, training and safety for all sister subsidiaries.

Local, express, and commuter routes connect the area with Downtown Syracuse and Syracuse University.

Centro of Oswego

Routes are based in the City of Oswego. Service began on August 28, 1972. Centro assumed operation of the Oswego-Fulton-Syracuse intercity bus service from S&O Coach on June 21, 1993. 

Routes generally travel east and west through the city, with connections to routes that travel to Fulton and Syracuse made in Downtown Oswego. Centro operates two student shuttle routes on the SUNY Oswego campus.

The neighboring communities of Fulton and Mexico are also provided with fixed route service.

Centro of Cayuga

Routes are based in the City of Auburn. Service began on April 2, 1973. Centro assumed operation of Auburn-Syracuse intercity bus service from Onondaga Coach on August 30, 1993.

Local bus routes are interlined in a continuous loop that makes a one-seat ride throughout the entire system and city possible.

Centro of Oneida 

Centro of Oneida began operation on April 1, 2005 with the acquisition of the financially troubled Utica Transit Authority based in Utica. The UTA was a local agency that did not have the same ability to raise revenues as a public benefit corporation such as the CNYRTA.  Merging the local county bus operations into the Centro system brought greater financial stability through savings in personnel and administrative costs. On October 1, 2005, Centro of Oneida assumed the operations of the VIP Transportation bus system in Rome. This merger of services has allowed for improved transit for citizens of Oneida County.
 
Even though, Oneida County public transit operations have been consolidated into one system, routes do not connect the cities of Rome and Utica. They also do not connect those cities to Onondaga, Cayuga, and Oswego Counties.  Service between Utica, Rome and Syracuse is provided by Birnie Bus Service.

Call-A-Bus

Centro's Call-A-Bus service provides paratransit service under the criteria set forth under the ADA. Members of the riding public, with disabilities that makes travel by transit buses difficult, are able to request pre-planned travel through the Call-A-Bus program. Service is offered in all areas that have regular route service.

Centro Parking, Inc.

Centro Parking, Inc. is a subsidiary that leases land from the State of New York in Downtown Syracuse to sell monthly parking. Centro Parking, Inc., has in the past, offered management of parking garages for local institutions like SUNY Upstate. Revenue that is generated from the parking lots contributes to the operational budget for transit services.

Bus routes

Centro operates thirty-six bus routes in Syracuse, eight bus routes in Oswego County, seven bus routes in Auburn, six bus routes in Rome, and eleven bus routes in Utica. In 2018, Centro had a ridership of 10.3 million trips, down from a 2008 high of 12.1 million trips.

In Syracuse and Utica, bus routes are numbered with a two digit base number. Short turn and variations of the base route are prefixed with an additional number to denote a different travel pattern. Bus routes in Oswego and Fulton use an alpha-numeric numbering scheme that suffixes the base route with a letter to denote a different travel pattern.

In each service area, routes operate in a spoke-hub model; focused on the downtown areas of cities served with routes extending to outlying neighborhoods and communities. This focus on downtown areas is the origin for the common name of Centro; the Spanish word for downtown. Buses arrive at the various hubs at fixed times throughout the day to allow for streamlined transfers. CNY Centro and Centro of Oswego operate campus shuttle routes for Syracuse University and SUNY Oswego, respectively. 

CNY Centro operates various Community Extra routes, open to the public, that directly serve public, charter, and parochial high schools attended by students who reside within the Syracuse City School District. High school students, that live 1.5 or more miles from their school, are provided with free travel to and from school on school days.

Special event service is operated by CNY Centro for sporting events at the Carrier Dome and Lakeview Amphitheater concerts. CNY Centro, Centro of Cayuga, and Centro of Oswego all operate extensive shuttle service to and from the New York State Fair. In recent years, with increased attendance at the State Fair, other Upstate New York transit agencies have provided buses and drivers to meet demand for parking lot shuttles.

Several Park-N-Rides are located throughout suburban Onondaga County that are served by CNY Centro bus routes.

Facilities

Syracuse Centro Transit Hub

The Centro Transit Hub in Syracuse, located at 599 S. Salina St, replaced the original Common Center transfer location at the intersection of S. Salina and E. Fayette Streets. 

The old Common Center utilized the four corners of the intersection to "line up" buses, leaving passengers unprotected from inclement weather and with limited seating. Centro riders often had to cross the busy intersection twice to reach their next bus. The congestion caused by having dozens of full-sized  buses and hundreds of people transferring buses at regular intervals throughout the day had been blamed for the lack of development in the 300 block of South Salina St.

Centro chose the current sit of the Hub in 2006 and plans were approved by the Federal Transit Administration in November 2008. The design team included Centro, QPK Design, Parsons Brinckerhoff, Robson Woese Inc., and Fisher Associates. Construction began in 2011 and the facility opened on September 4, 2012. The facility offers twenty-two covered bus bays, covered outdoor seating, and an indoor lobby with seating, public restrooms, information booth and ticket vending machines.

William F. Walsh Regional Transportation Center

The William F. Walsh Regional Transportation Center is the long-distance ground travel (rail and bus) terminal serving the Syracuse, New York area, located at 1 Walsh Circle. The RTC is operated by Centro subsidiary Intermodal Transportation Center, Inc. The transportation center is served by many local bus routes and provides connections to Amtrak, Greyhound, Megabus and Trailways of New York.

Utica Centro Transit Hub

The Centro Transit Hub in Utica, located at 15 Elizabeth St, replaced the original Busy Corner transfer location located at the intersection of Genesee, Bleecker and Lafayette Streets.

The transfer point was moved one block east to Charlotte Street between Bleecker and Elizabeth Streets. This portion of Charlotte Street was closed and converted to a center island platform with nine bus bays and seating. A lobby with an enclosed waiting area, information booth, ticket vending machines and public restrooms was also constructed. The facility opened for service on February 4, 2013.

Rome Centro Transit Hub

The Centro Transit Hub in Rome, located at 207 W Liberty St, replaced the original transfer location located at the Liberty-George parking garage. It is owned by the city of Rome and leased to Centro of Oneida. The Liberty-George parking structure was deemed structurally unsound and demolished in 2019, with Centro pre-emptively moving to a temporary location in 2018. The new, permanent facility offers an enclosed waiting area and information booth and opened on November, 2, 2020.

Active bus fleet

See also 
 Capital District Transportation Authority - Capital District, New York
 Metropolitan Transportation Authority - New York Metropolitan Area
 New York State Thruway Authority
 Niagara Frontier Transportation Authority - Buffalo, New York
 Rochester-Genesee Regional Transportation Authority - Rochester, New York
 List of bus routes in Onondaga County, New York
 Port of Oswego Authority

References

External links 
 Official CENTRO website
 BusTalk Surface Transportation Galleries - Centro bus photos
 "Centro will use $2.65M from feds to help buy buses from Whitestown", Rome Sentinel, March 6, 2009.  Retrieved on 3 October 2009.
 New York Streets Webcams

Bus transportation in New York (state)
Transit authorities with natural gas buses
Transportation in Syracuse, New York
Railroads in Syracuse, New York
Public benefit corporations in New York (state)
Government agencies established in 1970
Central New York
Companies based in Syracuse, New York
1970 establishments in New York (state)